Laguna Heat is a 1987 American drama film directed by Simon Langton and written by D.M. Eyre, Pete Hamill and David Burton Morris. The film stars Harry Hamlin, Jason Robards, Rip Torn, Catherine Hicks, Anne Francis and James Gammon. The film premiered on HBO on November 15, 1987.

Plot

Cast 
Harry Hamlin as Tom Shephard
Jason Robards as Wade Shephard
Rip Torn as Joe Datilla
Catherine Hicks as Jane Algernon
Anne Francis as Helene Long
James Gammon as Grimes
Jeff Kober as Vic Harmon
Dehl Berti as Azul Mercante
Clyde Kusatsu as Coroner
Rutanya Alda as Dr. Kroyden
Gary Pagett as Pavliki
Fred Ponzlov as Ricky Hyams
Tom Pedi as Jimmy Hylkama
Peggy Doyle as Dot Hylkama
Peter Brocco as Judge Rubio
Peter Jason as Chief Hanover
David Komatz as Chauffeur

References

External links
 

1987 television films
1987 films
1987 drama films
HBO Films films
Films directed by Simon Langton
American drama television films
1980s English-language films
1980s American films